Admiral Sir Reginald Neville Custance,  (20 September 1847 – 30 August 1935) was a Royal Navy officer. He was the eldest son of General William Neville Custance CB.

Naval career
Custance joined the Royal Navy in 1860. Promoted to captain on 31 December 1885, he was given command of the cruiser HMS Phaeton in January 1890, of the battleship HMS Barfleur in February 1895 and of the cruiser HMS Blenheim in September 1898. He went on to be Director of Naval Intelligence in March 1899, serving until November 1902, when he was asked to take the position of Second-in-Command of the Mediterranean Fleet, after the sudden death of Rear-Admiral Burges Watson. During his first year as Director, he had been promoted to flag rank as a rear-admiral on 1 August 1899, and he was promoted to vice-admiral on 20 October 1904. He was appointed Second-in-Command of the Channel Fleet in February 1907.

References

1847 births
1935 deaths
Directors of Naval Intelligence
Royal Navy admirals
Knights Grand Cross of the Order of the Bath
Knights Commander of the Order of St Michael and St George
Commanders of the Royal Victorian Order